Ropin' the Wind is the third studio album by the American country music artist Garth Brooks. It was released on September 2, 1991, and was his first studio album to debut at No. 1 the Billboard 200 chart and the Top Country Albums chart. It was the first album by a country singer to top both of these charts since Kenny Rogers just over a decade earlier. It had four runs at No. 1 between September 28, 1991, and April 3, 1992, spending a combined 18 weeks at the top, eventually being certified 14× Platinum by the RIAA in 1998. In the UK, it reached the Top 50 pop albums list and went to No. 1 for several months on the country charts. It is the last studio album on Capitol Records Nashville until the 1995 album Fresh Horses.

The track "Shameless" is a cover version of a Billy Joel song recorded on his 1989 album Storm Front.

According to the music review website Allmusic, Ropin' the Wind was the first country album to debut at No. 1 on the Billboard 200.

Background
Brooks commented on the album saying:
"Ropin' the Wind was what we called the son of Fences. Ropin' the Wind was made in this kind of tour that we were on from No Fences. We were gone, pretty much 250 days out of the year. And in that remaining 100 days, I elected to cut Ropin' The Wind, and try to write for it. This album became a lot bigger than I ever thought it could possibly be. And when I listen to the singles off of it like 'Rodeo', 'What She's Doing Now', 'The River', 'Papa Loved Mama', and 'Shameless', I look at it and stand very proud. And then when I also look at the cuts, 'Against The Grain', 'Cold Shoulder', these songs I am equally proud of."

Reception
Ropin' the Wind debuted at No. 1 on the U.S. Billboard 200, becoming his first, and No. 1 on the Top Country Albums number-one album selling 400,000 copies, becoming his second No. 1 country album. In September 1998, Ropin' the Wind was certified 14 x platinum by the RIAA.

Track listing

Personnel

Garth Brooks – lead and backing vocals, acoustic guitar
Susan Ashton – backing vocals
Bruce Bouton – lap and pedal steel guitars, Dobro
Sam Bush – mandolin
Mark Casstevens – acoustic guitar
Mike Chapman – bass guitar
Charles Cochran – string arrangements
Larry Cordle – backing vocals
Jerry Douglas – Dobro
Carl Jackson – backing vocals
Chris Leuzinger – electric guitar
Rob Hajacos – fiddle
Kenny Malone - percussion
Edgar Meyer – acoustic bass
Milton Sledge – drums, percussion
Bobby Wood – keyboards
Trisha Yearwood – backing vocals
Nashville String Machine – string orchestra

Charts

Weekly charts

Singles

Other charted songs

Year-end charts

Decade-end charts

Certifications and sales

See also
List of best-selling albums in the United States

References

1991 albums
Garth Brooks albums
Albums produced by Allen Reynolds
Liberty Records albums
Canadian Country Music Association Top Selling Album albums